Georgiy Sergeevich "George" Starostin (born 4 July 1976) is a Russian linguist. He is the son of the late historical linguist Sergei Starostin (1953–2005), and his work largely continues his father's. He is also known as a self-published music reviewer, author of the Only Solitaire Blog.

Research 
Starostin focuses almost exclusively on maintaining the following of his father's projects: the Evolution of Human Languages project; The Tower of Babel, a publicly searchable online database containing information about many Eurasia's language families; and STARLING, a software package to aid comparative linguists.

Evolution of Human Languages 

The Evolution of Human Languages (EHL) is an international project – of which Starostin inherited his father's membership – on "the linguistic prehistory of humanity" coordinated by the Santa Fe Institute. The project distinguishes about 6000 languages currently spoken around the world, and aims to provide a detailed classification similar to the accepted classification of biological species.

Their idea is that "all representatives of the species Homo sapiens presumably share a common origin, [so] it would be natural to suppose – although this is a goal yet to be achieved – that all human languages also go back to some common source. Most existing classifications, however, do not go beyond some 300-400 language families that are relatively easy to discern. This restriction has natural reasons: languages must have been spoken and constantly evolving for at least 40,000 years (and quite probably more), while any two languages separated from a common source inevitably lose almost all superficially common features after some 6,000-7,000 years".

Tower of Babel project 

The project aims to "join efforts in the research of long range connections between established language families of the world. The Internet is used to combine these attempts and to build up a commonly accessible database of roots, or etyma reconstructed for the World's major (and minor) linguistic stocks." Starostin's role specifically is for hosting the website.

Starling database program 
The Starling database management system software program is part of his father's Tower of Babel project. This software program aims to support "various types of linguistic text and database processing, including handling of linguistic fonts in the DOS and WINDOWS operating systems, operations with linguistic databases and Internet presentation of linguistic data".

Music criticism 
Since 1998, Starostin has also written a large number of extensive reviews of rock music groups and albums on his site, Only Solitaire, named after a Jethro Tull song. Until April 2006 the site was frequently updated, and covers in detail the music of most of the major rock groups and musicians of the 1960s and 1970s, although he has reviewed less material of groups primarily associated with the 1980s and beyond. He has said that the main reason for this is because he believes that rock music has been becoming steadily worse since the 1960s to the point that it is now "dead", and cites Mark Prindle as the original inspiration for him becoming an online music critic.

Publications 
Starostin has written a number of articles on Dravidian, Yeniseian, Khoisan, and language isolates. A selection includes:

 1995, "The Structure of the Ket Verbal Form", with KY Reshetnikov, in: Ket Volume, issue 4 (1995, Moscow). (Russian language)
 1995, "The Morphology of the Kott Verb and the Reconstruction of the Proto-Yenisseian Verbal System", in: Ket Volume, issue 4 (1995, Moscow). (Russian language)
 1997, "Alveolar Consonants in Proto-Dravidian: One or More?", in: "Proceedings on South Asian Languages" (July 1–4, 1997), Moscow .
 2002, "On The Genetic Affiliation Of The Elamite Language", in: Mother Tongue, Vol. 7, 2002.
 2003, "A lexicostatistical approach towards reconstructing Proto-Khoisan", in: Mother Tongue, Vol. 8, 2003.
 2005, "Some Aspects Of The Historical Development Of Clicks In Khoisan Languages", in: "Aspects of Comparative Linguistics", v. 1 (2005, Moscow, RSUH Publishers). (Russian language)
2008 "From modern Khoisan languages to Proto-Khoisan: The value of intermediate reconstructions" (originally in: Aspects of Comparative Linguistics 3 (2008), 337–470, Moscow: RSUH Publishers)

See also
Moscow School of Comparative Linguistics

References

External links 
 Notes on the Moscow Conference on Long-Range Comparison
 Starostin's critical assessment of the Dené-Yeniseian proposal
 Only Solitaire: George Starostin's music reviews at starlingdb.org.

1976 births
Complex systems scientists
Dravidologists
Linguists from Russia
Linguists of Elamite
Linguists of Khoisan languages
Linguists of Nilo-Saharan languages
Living people
Long-range comparative linguists
Moscow School of Comparative Linguistics
Paleolinguists
Russian bloggers
Russian music critics
Santa Fe Institute people